The Arifs are a South East London-based Turkish criminal organization heavily involved in armed robbery, drug trafficking and other racketeering-related activities within London's underworld since the late 1960s. Following the downfall of the Kray brothers, the Arifs were one of several criminal organisations who took control of the London underworld including the Clerkenwell crime syndicate and the Brindle family with whom they were engaged in a highly publicised gangland war during the 1990s.

The Arifs themselves were considered the leading crime family in the London area throughout the late 1980s before the arrest and conviction of most of its leadership, including most of the Arif family members, for armed robbery and drug-related offences in early 1990s.  In 2004, the Irish Daily Mirror called the Arifs "Britain's No 1 crime family." This was also said by some media outlets in 2016.

History
They are Turkish-Cypriot in origin have been operating in South-East London since the 1960s.  After the demise of the Kray brothers, several criminal enterprises attempted to move into the vacuum left behind. The Arifs are known to be, or to have been involved in racketeering, drug smuggling, armed robbery and murders.  The gang is led by brothers Deniz, Mehmet and Doğan Arif but more brothers are involved in the various operations.

In November 1990, Deniz and Mehmet, wearing Ronald Reagan masks and wielding shotguns, were arrested in Woodhatch (Reigate, Surrey) as they attempted to rob a Securicor van. Mehmet Arif, who was driving a pick-up used in the robbery, was shot by police, but survived. His passenger, Kenneth Baker, was armed with a sawn-off shotgun, and was shot dead as he attempted to open fire on officers.

Bekir Arif, 52, known as "The Duke", one of seven brothers in the family, was convicted of conspiracy to supply 100 kg of heroin worth £12.5 million in 1999 and given a 23-year term of imprisonment.  Dogan Arif, also jailed for drug smuggling, is said to be controlling the family fortune from prison. Their family is said to maintain ties with relations in Turkey who oversee shipments arriving in mainland Europe.

See also
 Turkish organised crime in Great Britain

Further reading
Murder of a good man; A drug gang had been cheated and someone had to pay. It cost an innocent victim his life.  Daily Record.  03 Dec 2007
Drugs gang 'godfather' is facing 20 years' jail.  Evening Standard.  04 Nov 2004
Busted; Exclusive Top Irish Drug Dealer Is Held In Eur2M Cocaine Raid.  The Mirror.  07 Apr 2004
Gun Culture: Gun Gangs Of The Capital; Opinion.  The Independent.  21 Sept 2003
End Of A Long Line Of Criminals.  The Scotsman.  3 May 2002
Perry police quiz gangsters.  Evening Standard.  30 Nov 2001
Bands of brothers; London's web of crime.  Time Out.  28 Nov 2001
Heroin mastermind jailed.  Western Morning News.  22 May 1999
Cypriot 'mafia' brother jailed for £12m drug plot.  Evening Standard.  21 May 1999
Just when you thought london was a safer place.  Evening Standard.  23 Sept 1998
Hitman Brought In To End Feud Jailed; 15-year minimum sentence imposed. Tangled London gangland war cost eight lives, Old Bailey told.  The Guardian.  25 Mar 1997
Gangland hitman came from Dublin.  The Independent.  22 Sept 1995
Caution: you are about to enter gangland Britain; British gangs are disorganised, crude and parochial. Triads, Yardies and Mafiosi are not. me They're here. And their methods are catching.  The Independent.  21 Aug 1995
Men who run Crime UK.  Sunday Times.  15 Jan 1995
All in the family: The British way of crime.  The Observer.  11 July 1993
Murder in a tight little manor; Two men were shot to death in a south London pub last weekend, but witnesses are thin on the ground. Cal McCrystal unpicks the gangland ties that blind.  The Independent.  11 Aug 1991
Death at the Bell.  Sunday Times.  11 Aug 1991
Police step up fight to curb gangland killings.  The Independent.  06 Aug 1991

References

Organizations established in the 1980s
1980s establishments in England
Organised crime gangs of London
British people of Turkish Cypriot descent